Faythe Harriers is a Gaelic Athletic Association club located in Wexford town, Ireland.

History

The history of the Faythe Harriers stretches back to the early 1940s, although the hurling club wasn't formed until 1949. In the late 1930s, the Mulgannon Harriers were the G.A.A. standard-bearers in the south end of Wexford town before they disbanded. 

In 1941, when a football street league was started in Wexford, John Murphy, Kevin Nolan, Jimmy Williams and a few others got together and decided to enter a team. They had no jerseys, so they approached the members of the Mulgannon Harriers committee for a loan of theirs. They said that they could on condition that they use another name. John Murphy, who was later to lead the club as Chairman, suggested the name "Faythe Harriers." Both of these clubs only played football, as hurling wasn’t played much in Wexford town at the time. The Faythe Harriers took place in that Street league in 1941 and the following two years saw them playing in the Junior Football Championship. 1943 saw the first county title coming to the club.

For the next few years, the club managed to struggle along without achieving any noteworthy successes. Then in 1949 Br. Frawley, who was attached to the Christian Brothers School at the time, started a novice street league in football and hurling. Once again the name Faythe Harriers re-emerged. Not only did they participate in football, but for the first time they entered a hurling team. With Brother Frawley, John Murphy, Paddy Cullen and a few others helping out, the club went on to win the hurling league. 

The Faythe Harriers had arrived. They were to set in motion a club that was to achieve every honour in hurling in county Wexford. During the sixties, the Harriers dominated club hurling in Wexford at juvenile, Minor and Under-21 level. However, the expected avalanche of Senior titles did not arrive due to a number of reasons. Although they won their third Senior title in 1965, they had to wait until 1981 for their next title. In between, they only played in two other finals in 1968 and 1979. They played in three finals since their last win: 1984, 1985 and 1991, losing them all to Buffers Alley. 

U-21 teams under "Heffo" Walsh put back to back titles together in 1987 and ’88 with many of these lads winning a junior championship in 1989. However, in the early 1990s, the Harriers Bord na nÓg committee, under Paud Browne and Jimmy Murphy, decided to make a major effort to put our under-age teams back at the top of the ladder again. It was a slow process but culminated in the club winning its first-ever Under-14 title in 1994. Since then the club has gone from strength to strength at underage level, winning two Co. Premier Juvenile titles and two Premier Minor titles. These underage titles were the backbone of the momentous Senior title win in 2001.

In 2016, Cillian Boggan captained Faythe Harriers U'14 hurling team to win the division one Féile na nGael hurling championship in Tipperary. It was the first time a Wexford team had taken top honours at the competition since 2001. Faythe Harriers has dominated Wexford underage club hurling in recent years.

Notable players
Lee Chin

Richie Kehoe - Wexford GAA
Jack Reck Browne
Stephen Nolan - Wexford GAA

Ned Buggy
Jim Berry - Wexford GAA

Honours
Wexford Senior Hurling Championship: 5
1960, 1962, 1965, 1981, 2001
Wexford Intermediate Hurling Championship: 1
1956
Wexford Under-21 Hurling Championship: 6
1967, 1968, 1969, 1987, 1988, 2012
Wexford Minor Hurling Championship: 15
1951, 1952, 1953, 1954, 1955, 1956, 1966, 1968, 1969, 1970, 1971, 1972, 1986, 1998, 2000, 2018, 2019
Wexford Under-16 Hurling Championships: 17
1950, 1952, 1953, 1954, 1955, 1956, 1964, 1967, 1968, 1969, 1984, 1987, 1988, 1996, 2000, 2011, 2016
Wexford Under-14 Hurling Championships: 6
1994, 1996, 1997, 2007, 2010, 2011
Wexford Under-12 Hurling Championships: 7
1978, 1979, 1980, 1981, 1993, 2000, 2014
’’’ Felie Division One Championships:’’’ 1
 2016

References

External links
Official Faythe Harriers Club website

Hurling clubs in County Wexford
Gaelic football clubs in County Wexford
Gaelic games clubs in County Wexford
Wexford, County Wexford